Allan Arthur may refer to:
 Allan Arthur (civil servant) (1915–1998), High Sheriff of Essex
 Allan Arthur (rugby union) (1857–1923), Scottish rugby union player

See also
 Alan Arthur (1905–1979), Australian rules footballer